Phataria is a genus of sea stars in the family Ophidiasteridae from warmer parts of the East Pacific. P. unifascialis is relatively well-known and ranges from Baja California to northwest Peru, including offshore islands such as the Galápagos. The Ecuadorian P. mionactis is not well-known.

Species
Species in this genus:

Phataria mionactis (Ziesenhenne, 1942)
Phataria unifascialis (Gray, 1840)

References

Ophidiasteridae